Acacia subcontorta is a shrub belonging to the genus Acacia and the subgenus Juliflorae that is endemic to central and central western Australia.

Description
The thin grey coloured bark has a fibrous texture and is longitudinally fissured along the main branches and trunks. The terete and glabrous branchlets have obscure ribbing and are a light brown colour at the extremities. Like most species of Acacia it has phyllodes rather than true leaves.

Distribution
In the north it is found on Balfour Downs and Ethel Creek Stations as well as in the Hamersley Range. The species shares much of the range of Acacia thoma. It is often situated on gently undulating plains and stony hardpan plains with skeletal shallow red-brown loamy soils mixed with ironstone pebbles and cobbles as a part of open Mulga woodland communities, sometimes with a spinifex understorey.

See also
List of Acacia species

References

subcontorta
Acacias of Western Australia
Taxa named by Bruce Maslin
Plants described in 2008